TIBCO Software Inc. is an American business intelligence software company founded in 1997 in Palo Alto, California.

It has headquarters in Palo Alto, California and offices in North America, Europe, Asia, the Middle East, Africa and South America. Its Palo Alto campus consists of four buildings on 16 acres in Palo Alto's Stanford Research Park.

History

In 1997, Vivek Ranadivé, who had previously founded and sold Teknekron Software Systems, Inc, founded TIBCO (The Information Bus Company) as a subsidiary of Reuters Holdings, which was then a new venture firm, with financial backing from Cisco Systems. The bus software allowed communication within the financial markets to happen in real-time and without human intervention. The technology was used by companies like SAP, IBM, and Oracle. Later in 1997, the company became one of 13 of Microsoft's partners in "push" technology, which delivers internet content to users for free through web browsers.

The company's initial public offering (IPO) of stock was made in July 1999, with a range value of $9 to $11. In its first day of trading, the company's stock doubled, from $17.38 to $32.38 per share and in early 2000, the company's value went from $22.75 to $244.88 per share, its record high at the time. After the IPO, the company raised $109.5 million and 7.3 million common shares sold for $15 each, above its range value.

In 2000, Yahoo! introduced Corporate Yahoo, a platform developed using TIBCO Software that allowed companies to develop customized communications between computers. Corporate Yahoo contained early examples of bundled e-mail, calendars, stock prices, and news displayed on intranet homepages. Hewlett-Packard was one of the partners in the software's development.

Post-IPO
The company survived the dot-com bubble burst and was listed among USA Todays e-Consumer and e-Business index of 50 technology companies that remained relevant in 2001 following the boom. During the first and second quarters of 2001, the firm's market capitalization approached $2 billion.Malik, Om (January 12, 2002). "Vivek Randive, Tibco CEO Is Living in Real Time". GigaOM. Retrieved July 20, 2013.

In 2002, Verity, Inc., an American business portal infrastructure software provider, announced an expanded alliance with the company to integrate Verity K2 Developer technology with TIBCO ActivePortal 4.0.

In 2003, British mobile operator Vodafone and Indian mobile provider Reliance Communications began using the firm's software, and Delta Air Lines used TIBCO software to organize its operation systems, including baggage handling, ticketing and check-in.Weinberger, Joshua (April 9, 2003).  "Tibco: Riding the Bus The Palo Alto, Calif., Company—Famed for Its Enterprise Application Integration Capabilities—Is Trying to Corner the Market in the Real-Time Distribution of Business Information Read What Real-Life Customers Have to Say About What Their Deployments Were Like, and What the Results Have Been". PC Magazine. Retrieved July 20, 2013. The same year, Lufthansa also used their software and Deutsche Bahn used it to construct digitally integrated train stations. "In Other News". Supply & Demand Chain Executive. April 9, 2003.

In 2004, Wellpoint (now Anthem) and RealMed used TIBCO technology to process HIPAA claims, and Harrah's casinos used predictive software to analyze system demands. Allstate used its programming to process insurance claims. Since its release in 2007, Apple Inc.'s iPhone has used TIBCO software to process user requests and facilitate sales. Xcel Energy launched its SmartGridCity program in 2009, which assisted companies seeking to reduce carbon emissions while using TIBCO software.

By 2011, the company's annual revenues had grown to $920 million, its customer base to 4,000, and its number of employees to 2,500.Ciaccia, Chris (December 21, 2011). "Tibco Tops Wall Street Profit View by Nearly 20%". TheStreet.com. Retrieved July 20, 2013.McCracken, Jeffrey (January 25, 2012). "Tibco to Hire Rapidly as Economy Improves, CEO Ranadive Says". Bloomberg News. Retrieved July 20, 2013. In March 2013, TIBCO announced that it had chosen LaunchSquad as its corporate PR Agency of Record.

In September 2014, TIBCO revealed it was being bought out by private equity firm Vista Equity Partners for $4.3 billion.

On December 5, 2014, the acquisition of TIBCO by Vista Equity Partners was completed. Murray Rode was made the CEO of TIBCO.

In 2019, TIBCO announced Dan Streetman as CEO and Murray Rode as Vice Chairman.

In October 2020, TIBCO announced the acquisition of Information Builders, Inc. (IBI), a leading data and analytics company based in New York City.

In September 2022, Vista announced its intention to merge TIBCO with Citrix Systems  a cloud computing and virtualization technology company that provides server, application and desktop virtualization, networking, software as a service, and cloud computing technologies based in Fort Lauderdale, Florida  under a newly formed Cloud Software Group (CSG). In July 2022, Citrix announced Tom Krause would become CEO of the company following its merger with TIBCO software.

Products
The company's infrastructure software focuses on real-time communication for business-to-business, business-to-consumer and business-to-employee data transfers,Narasimhan, Balaji (October 17, 2011). "Thinking Outside the Box". The Hindu Business Line. Retrieved July 23, 2013. including facilitation of communication between otherwise incompatible software. The company provides middleware, which allows for access to real-time data between multiple systems while predicting users' needs. The software appears in Amazon.com's personalized product recommendations and FedEx's package tracking system. Clients also use the software's feedback to deliver offers to customers based on their browsing habits.TIBCO EBX is a multi dimensional (vector) MDM master data management software. EBX provides consistent and accurate data for any domain. Create maximum flexibility through fully configurable applications. Empower business users with self-service capabilities and collaborative governance.TIBCO ActiveSpaces is an expandable, in-memory system-of-record datastore. It stores, retrieves, and queries data stored in tables and distributes changes to that data in real time. It can function as an alternative to a database datastore (with ACID properties and query filtering criteria expressed as SQL-compatible strings) and can process large amounts of distributed data.TIBCO BusinessEvents is a complex event processing (CEP) software used to identify patterns across a business by correlating large volumes of data with external events and applying rules to identify situations that require a response.TIBCO Data Virtualization is a data virtualization software that orchestrates access to multiple data sources. It was originally written by Composite Software.TIBCO LogLogic collects logs and events from network devices, servers, databases, operating systems and applications.TIBCO MDM  is the legacy master data management software for aligning enterprise data across multiple business units, departments and partners and synchronizing the information with IT transactional systems.TIBCO MessagingTIBCO Messaging provides components to support messaging and communications. From high-performance (millions of messages a second) to low latency (sub-microsecond delivery) to fully transactional enterprise-class distribution, streaming data and open source support.

Components of TIBCO Messaging:
 TIBCO Enterprise Message Service is a standards-based messaging platform built around supporting the JMS 1.1 and 2.0 standards. TIBCO Enterprise Message Service is TCK certified for both JMS 1.1 and 2.0.
 TIBCO eFTL is the edge node communications system to provide websocket, nodejs, and mobile communication support for the components in the TIBCO Messaging Suite.
 TIBCO FTL is the backbone for low-latency communication and is used to provide content-based delivery of data for real-time applications. TIBCO FTL is at the core of TIBCO's integration communication.
 TIBCO Apache Kafka Distribution is an open source streaming platform providing a distributed approach to data distribution and streaming.
 TIBCO Eclipse Mosquitto Distribution is an open source IoT communications platform supporting MQTT for data distribution.TIBCO MFT is managed file transfer for secure exchange of data and files.TIBCO Spotfire is an analytics and business intelligence platform for analysis of data by predictive and complex statistics.Henschen, Doug (March 10, 2010). "Tibco Brings Analytics to Spotfire 3.1". InformationWeek. Retrieved July 23, 2013. During the 2010 World Cup, FIFA used this software to give viewers analytics on country teams' past performances. Its components include TIBCO Enterprise Runtime for R, a runtime engine for the R programming language, which was added in September 2012 as part of Spotfire 5.0.TIBCO tibbr, announced in January 2011, is a social media system for the workplace. It manages input and output feeds to outside programs and integrates with other social media platforms. Sixty companies, encompassing 50,000 users, have signed up. tibbr 3.0, launched in June 2011, added HD video conferencing, and distinguishes between public and private information sharing.TIBCO's tibbr May Be the Enterprise 2.0 Solution You've Been Waiting For, Klint Finley et al, Jan 24, 2011 

Other products include TIBCO GridServer, TIBCO Flogo and TIBCO StreamBase.

Historical productsTIBCO ActiveMatrix is a technology-neutral platform for composite business process management (BPM) and service-oriented architecture (SOA) applications. The platform includes products for service creation and integration, distributed service and data grids, packaged applications, BPM and governance.TIBCO Clarity is a tool for analyzing and cleansing raw data.TIBCO Rendezvous a message bus for enterprise Application integration (EAI) with a messaging API in several programming languages.TIBCO Hawk''' is a software product that allows monitoring and management of distributed computing applications.

Acquisitions
The company has made the following acquisitions:

In 1997, it acquired inCommon, a push software company.
In 1999, it acquired InConcert, a telecommunication workflow company.
In 2000, it acquired Extensibility, an XML technology company.
In 2002, it acquired Talarian, which developed SmartSockets.
In 2004, the company acquired Staffware for automating, integrating and dynamically managing business processes.
In 2005, it acquired Objectstar, a mainframe integrator.
In 2005, it acquired Velosel, a master data management software provider.
In 2007, the company acquired Spotfire, which marketed analytics for business intelligence.
In 2008, it purchased Insightful Corporation, including the S-PLUS data analysis programming language. 
In 2009, it entered the grid computing and cloud computing markets with its acquisition of DataSynapse.
On March 25, 2010, the company acquired Netrics, a privately held provider of enterprise data matching software products.
On April 20, 2010, it acquired Kabira Technologies Inc., a privately held provider of in-memory transaction-processing software.
On September 16, 2010, the company acquired Proginet (file transfer).
On September 23, 2010, it acquired OpenSpirit, a provider of data and application integration for exploration and production of oil and gas.
On December 8, 2010, the company acquired Loyalty Lab Inc., a privately held independent provider of loyalty management software.
On August 30, 2011, it acquired Nimbus, a UK-headquartered provider of business process discovery and analysis applications.
On April 12, 2012, the company acquired LogLogic, a big data management company.
On March 25, 2013, it acquired Maporama Solutions, a privately held provider of location intelligence and geospatial analytics solutions.
On June 11, 2013, it acquired StreamBase Systems, an event-processing and streaming analytics software provider.
On September 18, 2013, it acquired Extended Results, a privately held provider of mobile business intelligence software.
On April 28, 2014, it acquired Jaspersoft, a commercial open source software vendor focused on business intelligence.
On August 25, 2015, it announced the acquisition of San Francisco-based Mashery, an API management solution from Intel.
On May 15, 2017, it announced the acquisition of Statistica, a data science platform provider.
 On July 6, 2017, it announced the acquisition of Virginia-based nanoscale.io, a microservices development platform.
 On October 5, 2017, it announced the acquisition of Cisco's Data Virtualization business (formerly Composite Software).
 In November 2017 it acquired Alpine Data Labs.
 On June 6, 2018, it announced the acquisition of integration platform-as-a-service leader Scribe Software.
 On December 4, 2018, it announced the acquisition of Paris-based Orchestra Networks, a Master Data Management leader.
 On March 7, 2019, it announced the acquisition of start-up SnappyData, a high-performance in-memory data platform.
 On October 22, 2020, it announced the acquisition of Information Builders, Inc. (IBI), a data and analytics company based in New York City.

Awards (between 2005 and 2012)
Named among This Year's Intelligent Dozen by TechWeb's Intelligent Enterprise.<ref name=bbgaward>TIBCO Software Inc. Chosen by Independent Panel as One of "The Dozen" Most Influential Companies for Intelligent Enterprises for 2009.boston.com. May 14, 2009.</ref>
Winner of the Stevie Business Award for Women in Business.
Finalist, Business Innovation Category at 2010 American Business Awards.
Named Company to Watch, TechWeb's Intelligent Enterprise 2010 Editors' Choice Awards.
Spotfire named Best-Ranked Solution by Yphise.
Editor's Choice for CMP's Intelligent Enterprise.
Multiple award winner, SYS-CON Media's 2007 SOAWorld Readers' Choice Awards.
Top Vendor across BPM, SOA and Web 2.0 technology categories.
CEO Vivek Ranadivé won the 2005 Wharton Infosys Business Transformation technology change agent Award.
Named in Chronicle 500 list of the Bay Area's "top publicly traded companies".

See also

 List of California companies

References

External links
 

1997 establishments in California
American companies established in 1997
Companies based in Palo Alto, California
Companies formerly listed on the Nasdaq
Software companies based in the San Francisco Bay Area
Software companies established in 1997
1999 initial public offerings
2014 mergers and acquisitions
Data analysis software
Business software companies
Private equity portfolio companies
Software companies of the United States